Álvaro Montero may refer to:
 Álvaro Montero (Spanish footballer) (born 1989)
 Álvaro Montero (Colombian footballer) (born 1995)